Marcel Pesch (14 June 1910 – 18 February 1985) was a Luxembourgian cyclist. He competed in the individual road race at the 1928 Summer Olympics.

References

External links
 

1910 births
1985 deaths
Luxembourgian male cyclists
Olympic cyclists of Luxembourg
Cyclists at the 1928 Summer Olympics
Sportspeople from Reims
Cyclists from Grand Est